The 1981 Torneo Godó or Trofeo Conde de Godó was a tennis tournament that took place on outdoor clay courts at the Real Club de Tenis Barcelona in Barcelona, Catalonia in Spain. It was the 29th edition of the tournament and was part of the 1981 Grand Prix circuit. It was held from October 5 through October 11, 1981. First-seeded Ivan Lendl won his second consecutive singles title at the event.

Finals

Singles

 Ivan Lendl defeated  Guillermo Vilas 6–0, 6–3, 6–0
 It was Lendl's 5th singles title of the year and the 12th of his career.

Doubles

 Anders Jarryd /  Hans Simonsson defeated  Hans Gildemeister /  Andres Gomez 6–1, 6–4

References

External links
 ITF tournament edition details
 Official tournament website
 ATP tournament profile

Barcelona Open (tennis)
Torneo Godo
Torneo Godo
Torneo Godo